The 1892 United States presidential election in New York took place on November 8, 1892. All contemporary 44 states were part of the 1892 United States presidential election. Voters chose 36 electors to the Electoral College, which selected the president and vice president.

New York was won by the Democratic nominees, former President Grover Cleveland of New York and his running mate former Congressman and Assistant Postmaster General Adlai Stevenson I of Illinois. Cleveland and Stevenson defeated the Republican nominees, incumbent President Benjamin Harrison of Indiana and his running mate U.S. Ambassador to France Whitelaw Reid of Ohio.

Also running a significant campaign that year was the Populist Party candidate, Congressman James B. Weaver of Ohio with his running mate state attorney general James G. Field of Virginia, although Weaver's primarily Western-based campaign did not perform strongly in New York. Despite receiving 8.51% nationally and winning electoral votes from six states, Weaver finished in fifth place in New York State, with only 1.23 percent of the vote, behind fourth-place Socialist Labor candidate Simon Wing’s 1.34 percent.

Cleveland carried New York State with 48.99 percent of the vote to Harrison's 45.58 percent, a victory margin of 3.41 points. In a distant third came the Prohibition Party candidate John Bidwell with 2.86 percent.

New York weighed in for this election as less than one percentage point more Democratic than the national average.

The Democratic win of New York’s electoral votes marked a personal comeback for Grover Cleveland in his home state, as he had narrowly won the state in his initial 1884 presidential campaign, but a narrow defeat here in 1888 had cost him the 1888 presidential election, partially the result of strong opposition to Cleveland from the Tammany Hall machine which dominated New York politics at the time.

Cleveland’s relatively narrow statewide victory relied heavily on a strong margin of victory in New York City, receiving more than 60% of the vote in New York County along with victories in Kings County, Queens County, and Richmond County. Cleveland also won nearby Westchester County and Rockland County. Harrison fared better upstate, where he won most counties, although Cleveland carried several upstate counties including Erie County, home to the city of Buffalo, and Albany County, home to the state capital of Albany.

Results

Results by county

See also
Grover Cleveland's second term as President of the United States

References

New York
1892
1892 New York (state) elections